The 2012 Idaho State Bengals football team represented Idaho State University as a member of the Big Sky Conference during the 2012 NCAA Division I FCS football season. Led by second-year head coach Mike Kramer, the Bengals compiled an overall record of 1–10 with a mark of 0–8 in conference play, placing last out of nine teams in the Big Sky. Idaho State played their home games at Holt Arena in Pocatello, Idaho.

Schedule

Game summaries

@ Air Force

Black Hills State

@ Nebraska

Sacramento State

@ Portland State

UC Davis

@ Northern Colorado

@ Montana

Northern Arizona

@ Cal Poly

Weber State

References

Idaho State
Idaho State Bengals football seasons
Idaho State Bengals football